The Columbus Citizens Foundation is a non-profit organization in New York City committed to fostering an appreciation of Italian-American heritage and achievement.  The Foundation, through a range of philanthropic and cultural activities, provides opportunities for advancement to  Italian-American students through various scholarship and grant programs. The Foundation organizes New York City's annual Columbus Celebration and Columbus Day Parade, which has celebrated Italian-American heritage on New York's Fifth Avenue since 1929.

History 
Founded by Judge S. Samuel Di Falco and Generoso Pope in 1944, the Foundation was established to memorialize and foster the contributions that their Italian forefathers brought to the United States.

Philanthropic achievements 
The Columbus Citizens Foundation's primary activity is awarding scholarships to students of Italian heritage. In addition to its scholarship activities, the Foundation has a tradition of raising funds for specific projects, often humanitarian in nature.

Columbus Day Parade 
The Columbus Citizens Foundation oversees and executes New York's Annual Columbus Day Parade on Fifth Avenue which  features over 40,000 participants and over one million spectators.

Former Grand Marshals of the Columbus Day Parade include: Maria Bartiromo; Antonin Scalia; Mario Andretti; Joe DiMaggio and Sophia Loren.

Membership 
At present, the Foundation's Membership includes over 550 men and women of Italian heritage representing the fields of law, medicine, government, business, education, and the arts.

References

External links 
 Columbus Citizens Foundation

Italian-American organizations
Organizations established in 1944
Christopher Columbus